Fishom (also Romanized as Fīshom) is a village in Rahmatabad Rural District, Rahmatabad and Blukat District, Rudbar County, Gilan Province, Iran. At the 2006 census, its population was 194, in 61 families.

References 

Populated places in Rudbar County